Adam Chambers may refer to:

Adam Chambers (politician), Canadian politician in Ontario
Adam Chambers (footballer) (born 1980), English footballer